Government General Degree College, Ranibandh, established in 2015,. is the government degree college in Bankura district. It offers undergraduate courses in science and arts. It is affiliated to Bankura University.

Departments

Science

Physics

Arts

Bengali
English
History
Sanskrit
Santali
Education

See also

References

External links 
Government General Degree College, Ranibandh

Universities and colleges in Bankura district
Colleges affiliated to Bankura University
Educational institutions established in 2015
2015 establishments in West Bengal